Yangdŏk station is a railway station in North Korea. It is located on the P'yŏngra Line of the Korean State Railway.

Railway stations in North Korea